In renal physiology, the filtration fraction is the ratio of the glomerular filtration rate (GFR) over the renal plasma flow (RPF). 

The filtration fraction, therefore, represents the proportion of the fluid reaching the kidneys that passes into the renal tubules.  It is normally about 20%.

GFR on its own is the most common and important measure of renal function. However, in conditions such as renal artery stenosis, blood flow to the kidneys is reduced. Filtration fraction must therefore be increased in order to perform the normal functions of the kidney. Loop diuretics and thiazide diuretics decrease filtration fraction. 

Catecholamines (norepinephrine and epinephrine) increase filtration fraction by vasoconstriction of afferent and efferent arterioles, possibly through activation of alpha-1 adrenergic receptors.

Severe hemorrhage will also result in an increased filtration fraction.

References

Renal physiology